The Cope's Bridge is a stone arch bridge which carries Strasburg Road (Pennsylvania Route 162) across the East Branch Brandywine Creek in East Bradford Township, Chester County, Pennsylvania. It is in the Taylor-Cope Historic District.

Before the construction of a bridge here, the site was known as Taylor's Ford. The original bridge at the site was probably timber, built about 1770, and funded by subscription. This was replaced by another wooden bridge in 1789. A petition to the Court of Chester County in 1804 complained of the decay of the bridge, and asked the county to erect a stone bridge instead. The bridge was built in 1807 and cost $26,911.03 It continues to carry traffic today.

References

Covered bridges in Chester County, Pennsylvania
Bridges completed in 1807
Covered bridges on the National Register of Historic Places in Pennsylvania
National Register of Historic Places in Chester County, Pennsylvania
Road bridges on the National Register of Historic Places in Pennsylvania
Wooden bridges in Pennsylvania